Nuphar polysepala (the great yellow pond-lily or wokas; syn. Nuphar polysepalum orth. err., Nuphar lutea subsp. polysepala (Engelm.) E.O.Beal) is a species of Nuphar native to western North America. The name Nuphar is Greek for "water-lily" and polysepala means many sepals. It is commonly found in shallow muddy ponds from northern Alaska and Yukon southward to central California and northern New Mexico, and can be recognized easily by its large floating leaves and bright yellow blossoms.

Habitat and ecology 
It reproduces by both seed and rhizome. Seeds are generally gathered from mid August to early October. The rhizomes are underground stems that are thick and fleshy. These rhizomes are hard to pry since they are submerged in mud and are difficult to dig. The leaves float on the water surface, and have an external waxy coating which makes the leaf waterproof and thus allows the leaf stomata to breathe freely; they are glossy green, oval, 10–45 cm long and 7–30 cm wide, with a notch at one side to the leaf stem. The leaves provide shelter for fish. The rhizomes (underground stems) are round and submerged in mud.

Flowers and fruit 
The flowers are 5–10 cm diameter, and have 6 to 12 (most often 9) bright yellow petal-like sepals; the true petals are small, hidden near the stamens. Inside the flower from top view anthers can be seen as red and true petals are wedge-shaped and are hidden by the stamens. The fruit is an ovoid green to yellowish capsule 4–6 cm (rarely 9 cm) long 3.5–6 cm wide.

Uses

Food 

The seeds are edible; they pop like popcorn, and can be steamed as a vegetable, dried and ground for flour, or can be cooked like oatmeal. They were a significant source of carbohydrates for the Klamath and Modoc peoples who inhabited the area near Oregon's Upper Klamath Lake.

Medicinal 
Leaves and rootstocks have been used for ulcerous skin conditions and swelling. The rootstock infusion is used as a traditional gargle for mouth, sore throats and douche for vaginal inflammation. The rootstock is prepared from two tablespoon chopped rhizome with one cup boiling water .

References 

Nymphaeaceae
Flora of Western Canada
Flora of the Western United States
Flora of California
Taxa named by George Engelmann
Flora without expected TNC conservation status